Aspergillus brevistipitatus is a species of fungus in the genus Aspergillus. It is from the Fumigati section. It was first described in 2013.

References

brevistipitatus
Fungi described in 2014